The Hypersonic Attack Cruise Missile (HACM) is a scramjet-powered hypersonic air-launched cruise missile project, the successor of the Hypersonic Air-breathing Weapon Concept (HAWC) and the SCIFiRE hypersonic programs.

Technology developed for the HAWC demonstrator was used to influence the design of the HACM, a U.S. Air Force Program of Record to create a scramjet-powered hypersonic missile it could deploy as an operational weapon. 

The contract to develop HACM further was awarded to Raytheon in September 2022. HACM will use a Northrop Grumman scramjet.

The system will give the US military" tactical flexibility to employ fighters to hold high-value, time-sensitive targets at risk, while maintaining bombers for other strategic targets"

References

Air-launched cruise missiles
Proposed weapons of the United States
Raytheon Technologies